Harold F. Huibgretse (August 20, 1907 – February 21, 2005) was a member of the Wisconsin State Assembly and the Wisconsin State Senate.

Biography
Huibgretse was born on August 20, 1907, in Lima, Sheboygan County, Wisconsin. He attended schools in Hingham, Wisconsin, and Cedar Grove, Wisconsin. Huibregtse was an automobile dealer, salesman, and securities dealer. He died on February 21, 2005, in Sheboygan Falls, Wisconsin.

Career
Huibgretse was a member of the Assembly in 1955 and 1957. In 1958, he was elected to the Senate in a special election following the death of Louis H. Prange. Previously, he was a member of the Sheboygan Falls, Wisconsin Board of Education. He was a Republican.

References

People from Sheboygan Falls, Wisconsin
School board members in Wisconsin
Republican Party Wisconsin state senators
Republican Party members of the Wisconsin State Assembly
Businesspeople from Wisconsin
1907 births
2005 deaths
20th-century American politicians
People from Lima, Sheboygan County, Wisconsin
20th-century American businesspeople